ENENSYS Technologies (or ENENSYS Group) designs and manufactures innovative software and professional equipment for the digital media distribution chain. ENENSYS addresses all types of broadcast networks, including Mobile (4G/5G), Broadband (IPTV, OTT), Terrestrial (ATSC 3.0, DVB-T/T2, ISDB-T/Tb, HbbTV) and Satellite (DVB-S/S2/S2X).

History 
The company was founded in 2004 by Regis LE ROUX.

In 2017, ENENYS acquired TeamCast, a French company based in Brittany (North West of France).

In 2018, ENENSYS acquired the OTT and IPTV Monitoring business of C2MS (formerly known as AJIMI).

In 2019, ENENSYS acquired Expway, and the Targeted Ad Insertion business of TDF.

As of March 2021, the company counts around 90 employees.

Activity 
ENENSYS has activities in the Terrestrial Broadcast market, Satellite broadcasting, Mobile and Broadband Telecommunications, Test & Monitoring and Ads Insertion technologies. ENENSYS has relevant legacy in some of these domains:

Ad Insertion 
 Targeted Advertising

Terrestrial Broadcast 
ATSC 3.0 - NextGenTV
DVB-T / DVB-T2
HbbTV - Hybrid Broadcast Broadband TV
Digital Terrestrial TV

Broadband 
OTT (Over The Top TV)
Video over IP

Mobile 
eMBMS Multimedia Broadcast Multicast Service
4G LTE
5G

Satellite Broadcast 
DVB-S / DVB-S2 / DVB-S2X

Products 
ENENSYS products include:

 MediaCast: Signalling Servers
 SmartGate: Broadcast Gateways for head-ends
 IPGuard: IP Redundancy Switch
 TxEdge
 StreamProbe: OTT and IPTV Monitoring Probe
 EdgeProbe: RF Monitoring Probe for Transmission Sites

Customers 
ENENSYS customers include Globecast (a subsidiary of Orange), Canal+, TDF.

External links 
 ENENSYS Official web site
TestTree web site
 DVB Consortium
 3GPP global initiave

References 

Technology companies established in 2004
French companies established in 2004
Manufacturing companies of France